Stephen Martines is an American actor, recording artist and athlete. He has appeared in several television shows, including Burn Notice, General Hospital, Guiding Light, Monarch Cove, The Closer and The Vampire Diaries.

Filmography

Television work

Personal life 
According to the New York Post, Martines is the nephew of bandleader and violinist Guy Lombardo.

References

External links

Living people
American male soap opera actors
American male television actors
Year of birth missing (living people)
Place of birth missing (living people)